The 1976 Chicago Bears season was their 57th regular season completed in the National Football League. The team finished with a 7–7 record, in their second season under Jack Pardee. The .500 record and second-place finish were the team's best since 1968. This was also the first season for the Chicago Honey Bears, the team's official cheerleading squad.

Offseason

NFL Draft

Roster

Regular season

Schedule

Standings

Season summary

Week 1 vs Lions

Week 9 vs Raiders

Awards and honors 
 UPI Coach of the Year – Jack Pardee

References 

Chicago Bears
Chicago Bears seasons
Chicago Bears